Folk or Folks may refer to:

Sociology
Nation
People 
 Folklore
 Folk art
 Folk dance
 Folk hero
 Folk music
 Folk metal
 Folk punk
 Folk rock
 Folk religion
 Folk taxonomy

Arts, entertainment, and media
 Folk Plus or Folk +, an Albanian folk music channel
 Folks (band), a Japanese band
 Folks!, a 1992 American film

People with the name
 Bill Folk (born 1927), Canadian ice hockey player
 Chad Folk (born 1972), Canadian football player
 Elizabeth Folk (c. 16th century), British martyr; one of the Colchester Martyrs
 Eugene R. Folk (1924–2003), American ophthalmologist
 Joseph W. Folk (1869–1923), American lawyer, reformer, and politician
 Kevin Folk (born 1980), Canadian curler
 Nick Folk (born 1984), American football player
 Rick Folk (born 1950), Canadian curler
 Robert Folk (born 1949), American film composer

Other uses
 Folk classification, a type of classification in geology
 Folks Nation, an alliance of American street gangs

See also
 
 Folkish (disambiguation)
 Volk (German word)